The Uihlein family is an American family known for their activities in business and philanthropy. Of German heritage, the family has roots in Wisconsin. Many members of the family are prominent political donors and activists.

Historically, the family had close ties to the brewing industry, with patriarch August Uihlein's uncle being the founder of what later became the Joseph Schlitz Brewing Company. The most prominent contemporary members of the Uihlein family are Richard and Elizabeth Uihlein, founders of Uline and conservative political donors.

Activities

Brewing industry 
August Uihlein emigrated to the United States around 1850 to work at the Krug Brewery in Milwaukee, Wisconsin. Founded by his uncle August Krug, the brewery later became the Joseph Schlitz Brewing Company, when after Krug's death, his widow Anna Maria married fellow German-American Joseph Schlitz. In 1875, Schlitz died in the sinking of the SS Schiller. Per Schlitz's wishes, management was passed to the four Uihlein brothers, August, Henry, Alfred, and Edward. When Anna Maria Schlitz died in 1887, the Uihleins acquired full ownership of the firm and the Uihlein family continued to run the brewery for the next century. The Uihleins kept the name Schlitz for the brewery because Americans had difficulty pronouncing their surname.

August Uihlein served as chairman of the board from the 1870s until his death. Several of August's children also remained close to the industry; his eldest daughter Ida married Frederick Pabst, Jr., son of brewer Frederick Pabst, in 1862. Ida's grandson Augie Pabst would take on leadership roles at the Pabst Brewing Company after an auto racing career. August's son Joseph carried on his work at Schlitz, eventually becoming vice-president of the brewery.

Many descendants of August Uihlein remained active with the company and the brewing industry at large. Robert Uihlein Jr., grandson of August Uihlein, served as an executive at the Joseph Schlitz Brewing Company, becoming president in 1961 and chairman in 1967. Robert also served on the board of directors of the United States Brewers' Association. Edgar John Uihlein, Sr. also served as an executive at the company.

Politics 
In contemporary times, the Uihlein family has been active in politics, mostly supporting and advocating for conservative causes.

Noted in the 21st century are Richard and Elizabeth Uihlein, founders of Uline, who are prominent conservative activists and donors. Prior to the 2016 election cycle, they mainly supported Republican candidates in Wisconsin and Illinois, but began to expand their support to other Republican candidates outside the Midwest. They supported Donald Trump during the 2016 presidential election and during the 2018 midterm elections, the pair were the largest single donors to the Republican party. Richard is known for his staunch economic and socially conservative views, including opposition to abortion and LGBT rights, unions, and support for deregulation and tax breaks. His wife Elizabeth, known as "Liz", tends to share these views, and is known for sharing them in her columns in the quarterly Uline catalogs.

David Vogel Uihlein, Jr., second cousin of Richard Uihlein, is also active in conservative causes. He has been a vice-chairman of the Lynde and Harry Bradley Foundation since 2001. The organization, commonly known as the Bradley Foundation, has been increasingly active in far-right causes, and "has become an extraordinary force in persuading mainstream Republicans to support sensible challenges to election rules", including Donald Trump's efforts to overturn the 2020 election results. The foundation traces its origins to Lynde and Harry Bradley, founders of the Allen-Bradley Company, the latter of whom is David Uihlein, Jr.'s maternal grandfather.

Not all of the Uihleins are active in conservative politics; Lynde Bradley Uihlein, sister of David Uihlein, Jr., supports liberal causes and is a donor to Democratic politicians.

Family tree 

 Josef Benedikt Uihlein (1813–1874), married Katharine Krug (1820–1867)
 August Uihlein (1842–1911), married Emily Werdehoff (1851–1910)
 Joseph E. Uihlein (1875–1968), married Ilma Vogel Uihlein
 David Vogel Uihlein Sr. (1920–2010), married Jane Bradley Pettit (1918–2001)
 David Vogel Uihlein Jr., married Julia Pickard Aring.
 Lynde Bradley Uihlein (born 1945)
 Edgar John Uihlein, Sr. (1877–1956)
 Edgar John Uihlein, Jr. (1916–2005), married Lucia Ellis Uihlein (1918-2012)
 Richard "Dick" Ellis Uihlein (born 1945), married Elizabeth Uihlein
 Robert Uihlein Sr. (1883–1959)
 Robert Uihlein Jr. (1916–1976)
 Robin Uihlein
 Augie Uihlein (1987-2012)
 Kiley Uihlein (born 1989)
 James Uihlein
 James P. Uihlein

References 

American families of German ancestry
Business families of the United States
Wisconsin Republicans
Uihlein Family